J. T. Thatcher (born July 12, 1978) is a former American football defensive back who played college football at the University of Oklahoma and attended Norman High School in Norman, Oklahoma. He was a consensus All-American in 2000. Thatcher won the Mosi Tatupu Award in 2000. He was also a member of the Oakland Raiders.

References

External links
NFL Draft Scout

Living people
1978 births
Place of birth missing (living people)
American football defensive backs
American football wide receivers
American football return specialists
African-American players of American football
Oklahoma Sooners football players
Oakland Raiders players
All-American college football players
Players of American football from Oklahoma
Sportspeople from Norman, Oklahoma
21st-century African-American sportspeople
20th-century African-American sportspeople